Detto, fatto. is an EP by the Italian rappers Gemitaiz and MadMan, released on November 30, 2012 by the Honiro Label. This is the first official release of the two rappers, as well as the second album released by the two after the Haterproof mixtape (2011). The EP consists of seven songs, including Antidoping, made together with rapper Ensi.

Track listing 

 Detto, fatto. (prd. Shablo & DJ Nais) – 3:28
 G.A.R.M. (prd. Denny the Cool) – 3:21
 Terra/Luna (prd. Ombra) – 3:56
 Antidoping (ft. Ensi) (prd. DJ 2P) – 3:56
 Non cambio mai (prd. Don Joe) – 2:56
 Sempre le 4 (prd. Don Joe) – 3:28
 Baci al cianuro (prd. PK) – 3:25

Bonus tracks in the CD version 

 Veleno Pt. 3 (Boss Doms Rmx) – 3:34
 La risposta (The Strangers Rmx) – 3:15
 Haterproof (Goldentrash & Lumberjacks Rmx) – 3:30

The CD version tracks are all present in the previous project Haterproof.

Charts

References 

2012 EPs
EPs by Italian artists
Gemitaiz albums